Catoptria petrificella is a species of moth in the family Crambidae. It is found in large parts of Europe, except Ireland, Great Britain, Denmark, Fennoscandia, the Baltic region, the Benelux, Hungary, Greece and Portugal.

References

Moths described in 1796
Crambini
Moths of Europe